The 2014 European Darts Open was the sixth of eight PDC European Tour events on the 2014 PDC Pro Tour. The tournament took place at the Maritim Hotel in Düsseldorf, Germany, between 11–13 July 2014. It featured a field of 48 players and £100,000 in prize money, with £20,000 going to the winner.

Peter Wright won his first European Tour event by beating Simon Whitlock 6–2 in the final.

Prize money

Qualification and format
The top 16 players from the PDC ProTour Order of Merit on 4 June 2014 automatically qualified for the event. The remaining 32 places went to players from three qualifying events - 20 from the UK Qualifier (held in Coventry on 13 June), eight from the European Qualifier and four from the Host Nation Qualifier (both held at the venue the day before the event started).

The following players took part in the tournament:

Top 16
  Michael van Gerwen (third round) 
  Gary Anderson (semi-finals) 
  Brendan Dolan (third round) 
  Robert Thornton (second round) 
  Peter Wright (winner)
  Dave Chisnall (quarter-finals)
  Ian White (second round) 
  Kim Huybrechts (third round) 
  Steve Beaton (second round) 
  Adrian Lewis (third round)  
  Mervyn King (third round) 
  Justin Pipe (third round)
  Andy Hamilton (quarter-finals)
  Simon Whitlock (runner-up)
  Wes Newton (third round)  
  Jamie Caven (quarter-finals) 

UK Qualifier 
  Michael Smith (second round)
  Kevin Painter (semi-finals)
  Ronnie Baxter (first round)  
  Jamie Lewis (second round) 
  Stephen Bunting (second round) 
  Dean Winstanley (first round)  
  Darren Webster (second round) 
  Gary Stone (first round)  
  James Wade (quarter-finals)
  Keegan Brown (first round)  
  Gerwyn Price (second round)
  Johnny Haines (first round)  
  Andy Smith (third round)  
  Jay Foreman (first round)  
  William O'Connor (first round)  
  Dennis Smith (second round) 
  Chris Aubrey (first round)  
  Darren Johnson (second round) 
  Colin Lloyd (first round)  
  Mark Dudbridge (second round) 

European Qualifier
  Jelle Klaasen (first round) 
  Ryan de Vreede (second round) 
  Christian Kist (first round) 
  Rowby-John Rodriguez (second round) 
  Mensur Suljović (first round) 
  Raymond van Barneveld (second round) 
  Ronny Huybrechts (first round) 
  Benito van de Pas (second round) 

Host Nation Qualifier
  Michael Hurtz (first round) 
  Arman Ertür (first round) 
  Martin Schindler (first round) 
  Michael Rosenauer (second round)

Draw

References

2014 PDC European Tour
2014 in German sport